Players Never Die is a 1997 album by singer Bobby Miller. The album was recorded in Chicago, Illinois and Dayton, Ohio. Mastering was completed at Sigma Studios in Pittsburgh, Pennsylvania.  Bobby Miller produced and recorded Players Never Die, and it was engineered by Ron Gresham, Brian Jensen, Jim Godsey and Hank Neuberger.

This was the singer's second major release and arrangements on this set were geared more towards smoother, jazzier compositions.

Track listing
 Chills Down The Backbones
 Cause It's On
 Since Yo Moms Ain't At Home
 Foolin'
 Don't Turn Away
 Like A Woman (In My Arms)
 Gut Bucket Blues
 Hidden Passion
 Wasted All My Tears 
 Mississippi Neckbones
 Foolin' (Street Light Mix)
 Passion
 Player

Bobby Miller (musician) albums
1997 albums